Derrick Jones may refer to:
Derrick Jones (defensive end) (born 1984), American football defensive end
Derrick Jones (cornerback) (born 1994), American football cornerback
Derrick Jones Jr. (born 1997), American basketball player
Derrick Jones (soccer) (born 1997), American soccer player

See also
Derek Jones (disambiguation)